Tripura East is one of the two Lok Sabha constituencies in Tripura state in northeastern India. The seat is reserved for scheduled tribes. In the first elections in 1952 the seat was represented by Dasarath Deb, the leader of the Ganamukti Parishad uprising.

Assembly segments
Tripura East Lok Sabha constituency is composed of the following assembly segments:

Members of Parliament

Election results

General election 1952

General election 1957
For this election Tripura became one Lok Sabha constituency with two representatives in parliament. The two representatives were Dasarath Deb of the Communist Party of India and Bangshi Deb Barma of the Indian National Congress.

General election 1962

General election 1967

General election 1971

General election 1977

General election 1980

General election 1984

General election 1989

General election 1991

General election 2004

General election 2009

General election 2014

General election 2019

General Elections 2024

References

See also
 List of Constituencies of the Lok Sabha

Lok Sabha constituencies in Tripura
Politics of Tripura